Cavan may refer to:

Places
 County Cavan, a county in the Republic of Ireland, part of the province of Ulster
 Cavan, County Cavan's county town
 Cavan Institute, a third level college
 Cavan, County Down, a townland in County Down, Northern Ireland
 Cavan, County Antrim, a townland in County Antrim, Northern Ireland
 Cavan, County Armagh, a townland in County Armagh, Northern Ireland
 Cavan (Killyman), a townland in County Tyrone, Northern Ireland
 Cavan, Côtes-d'Armor, a commune of the Côtes-d'Armor département, in France
 Cavan, Ontario, a township in Peterborough County, Ontario, Canada
 Cavan, South Australia, a suburb of Adelaide, South Australia
 Cavan, New South Wales, a rural community in New South Wales, Australia

Political constituencies

Parliament of Ireland (1800)
 Belturbet (Parliament of Ireland constituency) (1614–1800)
 Cavan Borough (Parliament of Ireland constituency) (1611–1800)
 Cavan County (Parliament of Ireland constituency) (????–1800)

House of Commons of the United Kingdom (1801–1922) and First Dáil 1918
 Cavan County (UK Parliament constituency) (1801–1885)
 East Cavan (UK Parliament constituency) (1885–1922)
 West Cavan (UK Parliament constituency) (1885–1922)

Dáil Éireann (1921–present)
 Cavan (Dáil constituency) (1921–1977)
 Cavan–Monaghan (Dáil constituency) (1977–)

People
 Earl of Cavan
a given name, anglicized from Caomhán (see Kevan)
 St Cavan of Inisheer (died around 865), Irish saint
 Cavan Biggio (born 1995), American baseball player
 Cavan Clerkin (born 1972), English television actor and writer
 Cavan Scott (born 1973), English freelance comic writer and author
 a surname
 Gilbert Cavan (died 1420), Roman Catholic cleric
 Harry Cavan (1915-2000), Senior Vice-President of FIFA (1980-1990) and president of the Irish Football Association (1958-1994)
 Mike Cavan, American collegiate football coach
 Ruth Shonle Cavan (1896-?), American sociologist

Other
 Cavan (unit), a Filipino unit of mass, volume, or dry measure
 Cavan (horse), an Irish thoroughbred racehorse